The Ranch was a New Zealand-Australian-American country music trio, which formed in 1997 by Keith Urban (guitar, keyboards and vocals), Jerry Flowers (bass guitar and background vocals) and Peter Clarke (drums and vocals). Most of the group's material was co-written by Urban and Vernon Rust.

They issued a self-titled album on Capitol Records in that year, and two related singles, "Walkin' the Country" and "Just Some Love", which appeared on the country charts before the group disbanded in 1998. Besides its two singles, The Ranch included "Some Days You Gotta Dance", which was issued in 2001 as a single by the Dixie Chicks, and also had Urban on guitar. After disbanding The Ranch, Urban resumed his solo career. Due to his solo success, The Ranch's album was re-issued in February 2004 on Capitol/EMI as Keith Urban in The Ranch with two bonus tracks: "Billy" and "Stuck in the Middle with You", the latter is a cover version of a single by the 1970s band Stealers Wheel. It also featured two music videos, "Walkin' the Country" and "Clutterbilly".

After The Ranch disbanded, Urban began a solo career. Many of his solo efforts have included Flowers.

Discography

Albums

AChart position of 2004 re-release as Keith Urban in The Ranch.

Singles

Music videos

Awards and nominations

ARIA Music Awards
The ARIA Music Awards are a set of annual ceremonies presented by Australian Recording Industry Association (ARIA), which recognise excellence, innovation, and achievement across all genres of the music of Australia. They commenced in 1987. 

! 
|-
| 1997 || The Ranch || ARIA Award for Best Country Album ||  ||

References

Country music groups from Tennessee
Capitol Records artists
American musical trios
Keith Urban
Musical groups established in 1997
Musical groups disestablished in 1998